Junín is a central department of Mendoza Province in Argentina.

Districts

Algarrobo Grande
Alto Verde
Junín
La Colonia
Los Barriales
Medrano
Mundo Nuevo
Phillips
Rodríguez Peña

External links
Municipal Website (Spanish)

1859 establishments in Argentina
Departments of Mendoza Province